Holiday Canada was a Canadian travel television series which aired on CBC Television in 1968.

Premise
Each episodes of Holiday Canada consisted of two National Film Board of Canada films about travelling within Canada.

Scheduling
This half-hour series was broadcast on Thursdays at 5:30 p.m. from 4 July to 3 October 1968.

References

External links
 

CBC Television original programming
1968 Canadian television series debuts
1968 Canadian television series endings
National Film Board of Canada series
Canadian travel television series